Nathaniel Waterhouse was an English politician who sat in the House of Commons  in 1656 and 1659.

Biography
Waterhouse was of the family of Waterhouse of Halifax and was a resident of Westminster. He was steward of the lands of Oliver Cromwell from 1651 to 1658.  In 1656, he was elected Member of Parliament for Monmouthshire for the Second Protectorate Parliament as a replacement for a member who chose another seat. In 1659 he was servant to Richard Cromwell. He was elected MP for  Monmouth Boroughs for the Third Protectorate Parliament in 1659.

References

 

Year of birth missing
Year of death missing
People from Westminster
Roundheads
English MPs 1656–1658
English MPs 1659